Hr. Svale Jonson Smør (c. 1380 – aft. 1442) was a Norwegian knight and riksråd (cabinet minister).

Svale was a son of the royal ombudsman Jon Hallvardson Smør. He was one of the most powerful men in Norway in the early 15th century. He lived in Bergen, and in 1404 was the lord of Bergenhus Fortress. In the mid 1420s Svale functioned as a riksråd and participated in settling numerous cases between Norway and Scotland. He is further mentioned as a knight in 1442, when he was present at the royal coronation of Christopher of Bavaria in Oslo.

Svale was married to Sigrid Gunnarsdotter Kane, and in 1412 inherited Hatteberg by Sigrid's uncle Gaute Eirikson of the Galte-family. Together Svale and Sigrid had the son Jon, and the daughters Bothilda and Inga. In addition, Svale had another daughter, also called Inga (whose great-granddaughter married into the Orm-family) by an otherwise unknown frille (concubine).

See also
 Smør
 Norwegian nobility

Sources
Handegård, Odd (2008), "Vår felles slektshistorie. Hardanger, Sunnhordland og Ryfylke m.m. 1170-1650", p. 109

Norwegian knights
15th-century Norwegian nobility
14th-century Norwegian nobility
People from Bergen
S